The Manuel Alves Grande River is a river of Maranhão and Tocantins states in northeastern Brazil. It is a tributary of the Tocantins River.

See also
List of rivers of Maranhão
List of rivers of Tocantins

References
Brazilian Ministry of Transport (Maranhão)
Brazilian Ministry of Transport (Tocantins)

Rivers of Maranhão
Rivers of Tocantins